Bernard Hofstede (born 22 September 1980) is a Dutch footballer who plays as a midfielder for De Treffers.

References

1980 births
Living people
Dutch footballers
VVV-Venlo players
Heracles Almelo players
FC Volendam players
Fortuna Sittard players
Eerste Divisie players
People from Tegelen
De Treffers players

Association football midfielders
Footballers from Limburg (Netherlands)